The Samyang 8mm F3.5 Aspherical IF MC Fisheye is an interchangeable camera lens by Samyang.

References
http://www.dpreview.com/products/samyang/lenses/samyang_8_3p5/specifications

008